Carl-Heinrich Rudolf Wilhelm von Stülpnagel (2 January 1886 – 30 August 1944) was a German general in the Wehrmacht during World War II who was an army level commander. While serving as military commander of German-occupied France and as commander of the 17th Army in the Soviet Union during Operation Barbarossa, under the pressure of the government in Berlin, Stülpnagel became implicated in German war crimes, including authorising reprisal operations against civilian population and cooperating with the Einsatzgruppen in their mass murder of Jews. Increasingly unable to reconcile his military duties and his moral objections to the regime's ideology, he joined the resistance. He was a member of the 20 July Plot to assassinate Adolf Hitler, being in charge of the conspirators' actions in France. After the failure of the plot, he was recalled to Berlin and attempted to commit suicide en route, but failed. Tried on 30 August 1944, he was convicted of treason and executed on the same day.

Early life
Born in Berlin into a noble family, Stülpnagel joined the Prussian Army straight from school in 1904, and served as a general staff officer in World War I. After the war, he served in the Reichswehr reaching the rank of Colonel in 1933. The same year, he was appointed head of the 'Foreign Armies' branch of the General Staff of the Army. In 1935, he published a memorandum in which he combined anti-Bolshevism with anti-Semitism. By 1936 he was a Major General and commanded the 30th Infantry Division in Lübeck.

On 27 August 1937, as a Lieutenant General, he was appointed Deputy Chief of the General Staff of the Army. In 1938, after the Blomberg-Fritsch affair and the Sudeten Crisis, he established contact with the Schwarze Kapelle, revealing the secret plan for the invasion of Czechoslovakia. Stülpnagel took part in the military opposition's first plans to remove Hitler from power, but the plans were largely abandoned after the Munich Agreement.

World War II

From 20 December 1940 to 4 October 1941, Stülpnagel was a General of Infantry (April 1939) and commanded the 17th Army. On 22 June 1941, after the launch of Operation Barbarossa, he successfully led this army across southern Russia on the Eastern Front. Under Stülpnagel's command, the 17th Army achieved victory during the Battle of Uman and the Battle of Kiev.

In February 1942, Stülpnagel was made German-occupied France's military commander, in succession to his cousin, Gen. Otto von Stülpnagel. In this position, he, along with his personal adviser Lieutenant-Colonel Caesar von Hofacker, continued to maintain contact with other members of the conspiracy against Hitler.

War crimes
Substantial archival evidence indicates that during his tenure as commander of the 17th Army and military governor of France, Stülpnagel was involved in war crimes. According to Richard J. Evans, he ordered that future reprisals for French Resistance activities were to take form in mass arrests and deportations of Jews. Following an attack on German soldiers, Stülpnagel ordered the arrest of 743 Jews, mostly French and had them interned at a German-run camp at Compiègne; another 369 Jewish prisoners were deported to Auschwitz in March 1942. In the Soviet Union, Stülpnagel signed many orders authorizing reprisals against civilians for partisan attacks and closely collaborated with the Einsatzgruppen in their mass murder of Jews. He admonished his soldiers not for the murder of the civilian population but for the chaotic way in which it was undertaken, particularly the premature taking of hostages and random measures. He ordered his troops to focus on Jews and Communist civilians, remarking that Communists were Jews that needed capture anyway; in order to improve relations with Ukrainians, even in cases of Ukrainian sabotage, local Jews were targeted for reprisal.

Thomas J. Laub presents a more complicated picture of Stülpnagel. According to Laub, while having a role in the Final Solution by their part in the deportation of Jews (although reluctantly, possibly by trying to avoid seeing the consequences of the deportation, which they preferred over mass shootings), both Carl-Heinrich and his cousin Otto (also his predecessor in France) disagreed with the regime's extreme aspects, including its racial agenda, and viewed the war as a traditional struggle between nation states rather than an ideological struggle. Otto von Stülpnagel tried to protest against illegal orders, but Hitler and his sycophants in Berlin had other ideas. From 1940, the Einsatzstab Rosenberg and SS officers in France began to try to undermine the military administration and forced the Vichy government to follow the Nazi regime's extreme policies more rigorously. Hitler regarded military complaints as a sign of ideological impurity and thus granted both the Einsatzstab Rosenberg and the SS autonomy, effectively eroding the authority of the military administration. In the end, Otto von Stülpnagel could not reconcile the demands of the regime with his conscience and resigned. Carl-Heinrich, seeing that open protests were futile, tried to overthrow the regime in secret. In the process, even though, like his cousin, he tried to utilize various strategems to reduce the number of reprisal executions (while trying to maintain an impression of himself as a Nazi hardliner), including creative accounting to fulfill the quota of reprisal victims set by Hitler, he still became involved in war crimes. German soldiers generally treated their Western opponents according to the laws of war and the German military administration ordered them to follow the Hague Convention (even though with their reprisals, both Otto and Carl-Heinrich appeared to violate the Geneva Conventions). Laub remarks that terms like good and bad, resistance and collaboration, as well as both the concepts "good army, bad SS" and "Hitler's willing executioners" do not prove good enough to explain the actions of German and French authorities in France. 

During his time in the East, Carl-Heinrich von Stülpnagel briefly tried to protest the relocation of Jews and other potential subversives, but abandoned his effort after seeing the Commissar Order and talking with Josef Bühler. After that even though his unit earned praise from the SS for its attitude towards Jews, Hitler noticed that it lagged behind other units. Unable or unwilling to face the censure, Stülpnagel gave up his command, citing poor health.

20 July plot
On the day in question, 20 July 1944, Stülpnagel put his part of the plot into operation. This mainly involved having Hans Otfried von Linstow, who was only informed of the plot on that same day, round up all SS and Gestapo officers in Paris and imprison them. However, when it became apparent that the assassination attempt in East Prussia had failed, Stülpnagel was unable to convince Field Marshal Günther von Kluge to support the uprising and was forced to release his prisoners. When Stülpnagel was recalled from Paris, he stopped at Verdun and tried to kill himself by shooting himself in the head with a pistol on the banks of the Meuse River. He only succeeded in blinding himself, and in the aftermath he was heard muttering repeatedly in delirium "Rommel", making himself the first to implicate the Field Marshal named as a party to the plot, leading ultimately to the latter's forced suicide.

Stülpnagel and his adviser were both arrested by the Gestapo, and Stülpnagel was brought before the Volksgerichtshof (People's Court) on 30 August 1944. He was found guilty of high treason and hanged the same day at Plötzensee Prison in Berlin.

Awards

 Knight's Cross of the Iron Cross on 21 August 1941 as General of the Infantry and commander-in-chief of the 17th Army

See also
Otto von Stülpnagel - cousin and German military commander of occupied France

References

Sources

 Cave Brown, Anthony.  Bodyguard of Lies, (Harper & Row, 1975)
 Koehn, Barbara. Carl-Heinrich von Stülpnagel. Offizier und Widerstandskämpfer. Eine Verteidigung (2008); scholarly biography in German
 
 Knopp, Guido Die Wehrmacht: Eine Bilanz, C. Bertelsmann Verlag, München, 2007.

External links

1886 births
1944 deaths
Holocaust perpetrators in France
Holocaust perpetrators in Ukraine
Military personnel from Berlin
German military governors of Paris
German Army personnel of World War I
German Army generals of World War II
Generals of Infantry (Wehrmacht)
People from the Province of Brandenburg
Recipients of the Knight's Cross of the Iron Cross
Executed members of the 20 July plot
People executed by hanging at Plötzensee Prison
Prussian Army personnel
Executed military leaders
Burials at Frankfurt Main Cemetery
German anti-communists
Reichswehr personnel
Von Stülpnagel family
Executed mass murderers